This page lists all described species of the spider family Cyatholipidae accepted by the World Spider Catalog :

A

Alaranea

Alaranea Griswold, 1997
 A. alba Griswold, 1997 — Madagascar
 A. ardua Griswold, 1997 — Madagascar
 A. betsileo Griswold, 1997 — Madagascar
 A. merina Griswold, 1997 (type) — Madagascar

B

† Balticolipus

† Balticolipus Wunderlich, 2004
 † B. kruemmeri Wunderlich, 2004

Buibui

Buibui Griswold, 2001
 B. abyssinica Griswold, 2001 — Ethiopia
 B. claviger Griswold, 2001 (type) — Kenya
 B. cyrtata Griswold, 2001 — Congo
 B. kankamelos Griswold, 2001 — Cameroon, Equatorial Guinea (Bioko)
 B. orthoskelos Griswold, 2001 — Congo

C

Cyatholipus

Cyatholipus Simon, 1894
 C. avus Griswold, 1987 — South Africa
 C. hirsutissimus Simon, 1894 (type) — South Africa
 C. icubatus Griswold, 1987 — South Africa
 C. isolatus Griswold, 1987 — South Africa
 C. quadrimaculatus Simon, 1894 — South Africa
 C. tortilis Griswold, 1987 — South Africa

† Cyathosuccinus

† Cyathosuccinus Wunderlich, 2004
 † C. elongatus Wunderlich, 2004

E

† Erigolipus

† Erigolipus Wunderlich, 2004
 † E. griswoldi Wunderlich, 2004

F

Forstera

Forstera Koçak & Kemal, 2008
 F. daviesae (Forster, 1988) (type) — Australia (Queensland)

H

Hanea

Hanea Forster, 1988
 H. paturau Forster, 1988 (type) — New Zealand

I

Ilisoa

Ilisoa Griswold, 1987
 I. conjugalis Griswold, 2001 — South Africa
 I. hawequas Griswold, 1987 — South Africa
 I. knysna Griswold, 1987 (type) — South Africa

Isicabu

Isicabu Griswold, 1987
 I. henriki Griswold, 2001 — Tanzania
 I. kombo Griswold, 2001 — Tanzania
 I. margrethae Griswold, 2001 — Tanzania
 I. reavelli Griswold, 1987 (type) — South Africa
 I. zuluensis Griswold, 1987 — South Africa

K

Kubwa

Kubwa Griswold, 2001
 K. singularis Griswold, 2001 (type) — Tanzania

L

Lordhowea

Lordhowea Griswold, 2001
 L. nesiota Griswold, 2001 (type) — Australia (Lord Howe Is.)

M

Matilda

Matilda Forster, 1988
 M. australia Forster, 1988 (type) — Australia (Queensland, New South Wales)

P

Pembatatu

Pembatatu Griswold, 2001
 P. embamba Griswold, 2001 (type) — Kenya, Tanzania
 P. gongo Griswold, 2001 — Kenya
 P. mafuta Griswold, 2001 — Kenya

Pokennips

Pokennips Griswold, 2001
 P. dentipes (Simon, 1894) (type) — South Africa

S

Scharffia

Scharffia Griswold, 1997
 S. chinja Griswold, 1997 (type) — Tanzania
 S. holmi Griswold, 1997 — Kenya
 S. nyasa Griswold, 1997 — Malawi
 S. rossi Griswold, 1997 — Tanzania

† Spinilipus

† Spinilipus Wunderlich, 1993
 † S. bispinosus Wunderlich, 2004 
 † S. curvatus Wunderlich, 2004 
 † S. glinki Wunderlich, 2004 
 † S. kerneggeri Wunderlich, 1993 
 † S. longembolus Wunderlich, 2004

† Succinilipus

† Succinilipus Wunderlich, 1993
 † S. abditus Wunderlich, 2004 
 † S. aspinosus Wunderlich, 2004 
 † S. saxoniensis Wunderlich, 1993 
 † S. similis Wunderlich, 2004 
 † S. teuberi Wunderlich, 1993

T

Teemenaarus

Teemenaarus Davies, 1978
 T. silvestris Davies, 1978 (type) — Australia (Queensland)

Tekella

Tekella Urquhart, 1894
 T. absidata Urquhart, 1894 — New Zealand
 T. bisetosa Forster, 1988 — New Zealand
 T. lineata Forster, 1988 — New Zealand
 T. nemoralis (Urquhart, 1889) (type) — New Zealand
 T. unisetosa Forster, 1988 — New Zealand

Tekellatus

Tekellatus Wunderlich, 1978
 T. lamingtoniensis Wunderlich, 1978 (type) — Australia (Queensland)

Tekelloides

Tekelloides Forster, 1988
 T. australis Forster, 1988 (type) — New Zealand
 T. flavonotatus (Urquhart, 1891) — New Zealand

U

Ubacisi

Ubacisi Griswold, 2001
 U. capensis (Griswold, 1987) (type) — South Africa

Ulwembua

Ulwembua Griswold, 1987
 U. antsiranana Griswold, 1997 — Madagascar
 U. denticulata Griswold, 1987 — South Africa
 U. nigra Griswold, 2001 — Madagascar
 U. outeniqua Griswold, 1987 — South Africa
 U. pulchra Griswold, 1987 (type) — South Africa
 U. ranomafana Griswold, 1997 — Madagascar
 U. usambara Griswold, 2001 — Tanzania

Umwani

Umwani Griswold, 2001
 U. anymphos Griswold, 2001 — Malawi
 U. artigamos Griswold, 2001 (type) — Tanzania

Uvik

Uvik Griswold, 2001
 U. vulgaris Griswold, 2001 (type) — Congo, Uganda

V

Vazaha

Vazaha Griswold, 1997
 V. toamasina Griswold, 1997 (type) — Madagascar

W

Wanzia

Wanzia Griswold, 1998
 W. fako Griswold, 1998 (type) — Cameroon, Equatorial Guinea (Bioko)

References

Cyatholipidae